Montaldi is a surname. Notable people with the surname include:
 Danilo Montaldi (1929 – 1975), Italian writer, intellectual and Marxist activist 
 Frank Montaldi, American cyclist
 Valeria Montaldi, Italian journalist and writer

See also 

 Montaldo (disambiguation)